Morganna is the most common name of the Kissing Bandit and ecdysiast Morganna Roberts.

Morganna may also refer to:
Morganna (.hack), an artificial intelligence character in the .hack franchise
An alternate name for Morgan le Fay

See also
 Morgana (disambiguation)